Like It Like That may refer to:
 Like It Like That (album), an album by Guy Sebastian
 "Like It Like That" (A Tribe Called Quest song), 1998
 "Like It Like That" (Guy Sebastian song), 2009
 "Like It Like That", a song by Regurgitator from their debut EP, Regurgitator

See also
 I Like It Like That (disambiguation)